Dietzhölze is a river of Hesse, Germany. It flows into the Dill in Dillenburg.

See also
List of rivers of Hesse

References

Rivers of Hesse
Rivers of Germany